Arthur Hills (1930 – May 18, 2021) was an American golf course designer. He designed more than 200 new golf courses, including private, resort, upscale, and public golf courses around the world. In addition, Arthur Hills' firm, Arthur Hills/Steve Forrest and Associates, has been requested to renovate or modify more than 120 courses, including some of the country's most renowned clubs, often in preparation for major USGA and PGA Championships.

Education
Hills earned a Bachelor of Landscape Architecture (Agronomy) from Michigan State University in 1953 and a Bachelor of Science from the University of Michigan.

Career
Hills designed his first golf course in 1967: the course was Brandywine Country Club in Toledo, Ohio. Hills stated that his main goal when designing a golf course was to make it playable for everyone of every skill level. Hills designed golf courses in Portugal (2001), Croatia (2012), and Sweden.

In later life Hills served as chief designer for Arthur Hills/Steve Forrest and Associates. Much of the work that he performed was redesigning golf courses.

Courses designed
The following is a partial list of courses designed by Arthur Hills:

Public golf courses designed by Arthur Hills

Arizona
 Heritage Highlands Golf and Country Club, Tucson, Arizona, New Private 18 1997
 Palm Valley Golf Club, Phoenix, Arizona, New Public 18 1993
 San Ignacio Golf Club, Green Valley, Arizona, New Public 18 1989

California
 Black Gold Golf Club — Yorba Linda, California 
 CrossCreek Golf Club — Temecula, California 
 Journey at Pechanga — Temecula, California 
 Half Moon Bay Golf Links (Ocean Course) — Half Moon Bay, California

Colorado
 Heritage Eagle Bend Golf Club — Aurora, Colorado
 Legacy Ridge Golf Course — Westminster, Colorado
 Walking Stick Golf Course — Pueblo, Colorado

Delaware
 White Clay Creek Country Club — Wilmington, Delaware 
 Plantation Lakes Golf & Country Club — Millsboro, Delaware

Florida
 Deer Creek Golf Club — Deerfield Beach, Florida
 LPGA International Legends — Daytona Beach, Florida 
 The Golf Club at Cypress Head — Port Orange, Florida 
 The Groves Course The Meadows CC, Sarasota, FL
 Stoneybrook West Golf Club — Winter Garden, Florida 
 Stoneybrook at Palmer Ranch — Sarasota, Florida 
 Coral Oaks Golf Club — Cape Coral, Florida 
 Heron Creek Golf Club — North Port, Florida
 American Golf Club — Vero Beach, Florida
 Vista Plantation — Vero Beach, Florida
 Palmetto-Pine Country Club — Cape Coral, Florida
 Tampa Palms Golf & Country Club — Tampa, Florida
 Miami Beach Golf Club — Miami Beach, Florida
 Myerlee country club (fort Myers Florida
 Wilderness Country Club — Naples, Florida

Illinois
 Stonewall Orchard Golf Club — Grayslake, Illinois 
 Bolingbrook Golf Club — Bolingbrook, Illinois

Maryland
 Blue Mash Golf Club — Olney, Maryland 
 River Downs Golf Club — Finksburg, Maryland 
 The Links at Lighthouse Sound — Bishopville, Maryland 
 Maryland National Golf Club — Middletown, Maryland 
 Waverly Woods Golf Club — Marriottsville, Maryland

Michigan
 Leslie Park Golf Course - Ann Arbor (refurbished) - Voted Michigan's Best Municipal Course by Golf Digest
 Walnut Creek Country Club North Nine — South Lyon, Michigan
 27-hole Bay Harbor Golf Club — Bay Harbor, Michigan
 The Arthur Hills Course at the Boyne Highlands Resort — Harbor Springs, Michigan
 Shepherd's Hollow — Clarkston, Michigan
 Double JJ Resort — Rothbury, Michigan
 The Legacy Golf Course — Ottawa Lake, Michigan 
 Stonebridge Golf Club — Ann Arbor, Michigan 
 HawksHead Links — South Haven, Michigan
 Fieldstone Golf Club — Auburn Hills, Michigan
 Glacier Club Golf Course — Washington, Michigan 
 Fox Hills Golf Club — Plymouth, Michigan
 Giant Oaks Golf Club — Temperance, Michigan (1969)
 Lakes of Taylor Golf Course — Taylor, Michigan
 Mill Race Golf Club — Jonesville, Michigan
 Lyon Oaks Golf Course — Wixom, Michigan
 Oakhurst Golf & Country Club — Clarkston, Michigan
 Pine Trace Golf Club — Rochester Hills, Michigan
 Red Hawk Golf Club - East Tawas, Michigan

Minnesota
 Chaska Town Course — Chaska, Minnesota — a top rated 18-hole municipal course

Missouri
 Peveley Farms Golf Club - Eureka, MO

Nevada
 The Legacy Golf Club — Henderson, NV

Ohio
 Legendary Run Golf Course — Cincinnati, Ohio
 The Virtues Golf Club (Longaberger Golf Club) — Nashport, Ohio
 Pipestone Golf Course — Miamisburg, Ohio
 Red Hawk Run Golf Course — Findlay, Ohio
 Shaker Run Golf Course — Lebanon, Ohio
 Stone Ridge Golf Club — Bowling Green, Ohio
 Weatherwax Golf Course — Middletown, Ohio
 Turnberry Golf Course — Pickerington, Ohio
 Detwiler Park Golf Course Toledo, Ohio
 Maumee Bay Golf Course -Oregon, Ohio
 Brookledge Golf Course - Cuyahoga Falls, Ohio

Ontario (Canada)
 Silver Creek Golf Course — Garden River First Nation, Ontario

South Carolina
 Arthur Hills Golf Course — Hilton Head Island, SC
 Cedar Creek Golf Club — Aiken
 Coosaw Creek Course - North Charleston

Tennessee
 River Island Golf Course, Kodak, Tennessee Now known as Island Pointe Golf Club

Texas
 Heritage Ranch Golf and Country Club (Fairview, Texas)
 Wolfdancer Golf Club — Lost Pines, Texas

Virginia
 Colonial Heritage Golf Club — Williamsburg, Virginia

Utah 
 Wingpointe — Salt Lake City, Utah closed November 15, 2015

Washington
 Harbour Pointe Golf Club (Mukilteo, Washington)

Wisconsin
 Washington County Golf Course — Hartford, Wisconsin

Private courses designed by Arthur Hills

California
 Bighorn (Mountains Course) — Palm Desert, California

Colorado
 Glacier Club - Valley Course — Durango, Colorado

Florida
 Myerlee Country Club, Fort Myers (1972)
 Palencia Club, St. Augustine, Florida
 Miromar Lakes Beach and Golf Club, Miromar Lakes Florida (Signature Golf Course)
 The Sanctuary Golf Club — Sanibel Island, Florida 
 FoxFire Country Club - Naples, Florida 
 Club Pelican Bay — Naples, Florida 
 Colliers Reserve — Naples, Florida 
 TPC Treviso Bay — Naples, Florida 
 Club Pelican Bay — Naples, Florida 
 Stoneybrook Golf and Country Club of Sarasota — Sarasota, Florida 
 The Preserve at Ironhorse — West Palm Beach, Florida 
 Country Club at Mirasol — Palm Beach Gardens, Florida
 Tampa Palms Golf and Country Club — Tampa, Florida
 Quail Creek Country Club — Naples, Florida 
 River Strand Golf and Country Club — Bradenton, Florida
 Forest Glen Golf and Country Club — Naples, Florida
 Wilderness — Naples, Florida
 Fiddler's Creek — Naples, Florida

Georgia
 The Golf Club of Georgia — Alpharetta, Georgia
 Olde Atlanta Golf Club — Suwanee, Georgia 
 The Standard Club — Johns Creek, Georgia
 Towne Lake Hills Golf Club — Woodstock, Georgia 
Indiana

 The Hawthorns Golf and Country Club — Fishers, Indiana

Illinois
 Chicago Highlands — Westchester, Illinois

Kansas
 Tallgrass Country Club — Wichita, Kansas

Kentucky
 Champion Trace Golf Club — Nicholasville, Kentucky 
 University Club of Kentucky — Lexington, Kentucky 
 Persimmon Ridge — Louisville, Kentucky

Maryland
 Manor Country Club — Rockville, Maryland
 Woodmont Country Club- Rockville, Maryland

Michigan
 Egypt Valley Country Club — Ada, Michigan 
 The Moors Golf Club — Portage, Michigan

Ohio
 Wetherington Country club — [West Chester, Ohio]
 Inverness Club — Toledo, Ohio (refurbished) 
 Kinsale Golf and Fitness Club (Signature Course) — Powell, Ohio
 Belmont Country Club — Perrysburg, Ohio
 Catawba Island Club — Port Clinton, Ohio
 Brandywine Country Club — Maumee, Ohio

Oklahoma
 Rose Creek Golf Club — Edmond, Oklahoma

Pennsylvania
 Regents Glen Country Club — York, Pennsylvania
 Colonial Golf & Tennis Club - Harrisburg, PA (Renovation)

Tennessee
 Westhaven Golf Club — Franklin, Tennessee 
 The Blackthorn Club at the Ridges — Johnson City, Tennessee

Texas
 Stonebridge Ranch Country Club — Hills Course — McKinney, Texas
 Trophy Club County Club — Whitworth Course — Trophy Club, Texas

Virginia
 Colonial Heritage Golf Club — Williamsburg, Virginia
 Heritage Hunt Golf & Country Club — Gainesville, Virginia 
 Trump National — Washington, D.C. (The River Course) — Potomac Falls, Virginia 
 Belle Haven Country Club — Alexandria, Virginia

Wisconsin
 La Crosse Country Club — Onalaska, Wisconsin

Courses Hills designed outside of the United States 
 Hills Golf Club, Mölndal — south of Gothenburg, Sweden
 Paraiso del Mar Golf Club, La Paz, Mexico
 Oitavos Dunes, Cascais, Portugal
 Croatian Dream Croatia
 The Vintage Club, east of Bangkok, Thailand

References

External links
 ASGCA Architect's Gallery — Arthur Hills entry
 Official Arthur Hills/Steve Forrest and Associates website
 American Society of Golf Course Architects profile

1930 births
2021 deaths
Golf course architects
Michigan State University alumni
People from Toledo, Ohio
People from Washtenaw County, Michigan
University of Michigan alumni